KHCR may refer to:

 KHCR (FM), a radio station (99.5 FM) licensed to serve Bismarck, Missouri, United States
 Heber City Municipal Airport (ICAO code KHCR)